OMA (Orthologous MAtrix) is a database of orthologs extracted from available complete genomes. The orthology predictions of OMA are available in several forms:
 OMA Pairs: for a given gene, a list of predicted orthologs in other species is provided.
 OMA Groups: a set of genes across different species which are all orthologous.
 OMA Hierarchical Groups: the set of all genes that have evolved from a single ancestral gene in a given taxonomic range.
 OMA Genome Pair view: the list of all predicted orthologs between two species.

See also
 Homology (biology)
 OrthoDB
 TreeFam

References

Genetics databases
Evolutionary biology
Phylogenetics